Louis Kravitz (also known as Lou Kay or Shadows) was a New York labor racketeer during the early 1930s.

On July 12, 1929, Kravitz, along with Louis Buchalter, Jacob Shapiro and two other gangsters, broke into the M. L. Rosenblatt clothing plant and wrecked $25,000 worth of machinery. The New York Times described them as "members of a gang which has been terrorizing nonunion clothing manufacturers".

Kravitz was among the first 9 people to be arrested under New York state law, along with Louis Buchalter, Jacob Shapiro, Bugsy Siegel, Harry Teitelbaum, Harry Greenberg and 3 others, which made "it a crime for men of evil repute to gather together". The arrest was seen as providing a test case for the law. The 9 were arrested in a suite in the Hotel Franconia, where, police charged, they were plotting to terrorize the clothing industry. On December 24, 1931, Magistrate Maurice Gotlieb ruled that the police had failed to prove that the men were meeting with evil intent.

Kravitz disappeared from public view in 1937 after the arrest of Buchalter and 28 others on suspicion of importing narcotics. By 1939, federal authorities were offering a $1000 reward for Kravitz's capture. He was finally apprehended in October 1941 and upon his plea of guilty was given a penitentiary sentence of one year and one day.

See also
 Inchoate offense
 Organized crime

References

Further reading
Messick, Hank. Lansky. London: Robert Hale & Company, 1973. 

Year of birth missing
Year of death missing
Jewish American gangsters
Gangsters from New York City